Albania established diplomatic relations with the Soviet Union on April 7, 1924. In the following decades, relations between the two countries began to deteriorate and on November 25, 1961, the Soviet government under the instructions of premier Khrushchev recalled its ambassador Iosif Shikin. The two countries reestablished diplomatic ties once again furthered by the Collapse of the Soviet Union (Russia being its successor) and the Fall of communism in Albania.

List of diplomatic representatives of Albania to Russia (1946–present)

References 

 
Russia
Albania